Sir Saiyid Fazl Ali OBE (19 September 1886 – 22 August 1959) was an Indian judge, the governor of two Indian states (Assam and Odisha), and the head of the States Reorganisation Commission which determined the boundaries of several Indian states in the December 1953.Their commission submitted the report in September 1953 broadly accepting the language as the basis of reorganisation of states.

Career
Fazl belonged to an aristocratic Zamindar (landlord) family of Bihar state. He studied law and began practicing. Eventually he was raised to the judiciary. Sir Fazl Ali was successively given the title of Khan Sahib first and of Khan Bahadur later. In 1918, he was made an Officer of the Order of the British Empire (OBE). He was knighted in the New Year's Honours list of 1941 and invested with his knighthood on 1 May 1942 by the Viceroy, Lord Linlithgow.

India became independent in 1947. Under the new dispensation, Fazl Ali was governor of Odisha from 1952 to 1954 and of Assam from 1956 to 1959. He died while serving as governor of Assam. Whilst in Assam, he made strenuous efforts to bring the disgruntled Naga tribals into the mainstream of society. He opened the first college in the Naga heartland in Mokokchung, which is today known as 'Fazl Ali College' in his honour. The College celebrated its 50th anniversary in 2010.

Fazl Ali headed the States Reorganisation Commission that made recommendations about the reorganization of India's states. For his services to India, he was bestowed with the country's second-highest civilian honour, the Padma Vibhushan, by the government of India.

External links 

 Lokshaba https://eparlib.nic.in/bitstream/123456789/1806/1/lsd_02_08_22-08-1959.pdf page 52
 http://assamassembly.gov.in/governor-list.html

1886 births
1959 deaths
Chief Justices of the Patna High Court
20th-century Indian judges
Governors of Assam
Governors of Odisha
Indian Knights Bachelor
20th-century Indian Muslims
Knights Bachelor
Indian Officers of the Order of the British Empire
Recipients of the Padma Vibhushan in public affairs
Indian Shia Muslims